The Footy Show is a Logie Award winning Australian sports and variety entertainment television program, shown on the Nine Network and its affiliates.
The show, which is dedicated to the Australian Football League (AFL) and Australian rules football, made its debut on 24 March 1994. The show has won several Logies.
Originally hosted by Eddie McGuire, from its inception in 1994 to 2005, he was replaced in the 2006 season by Garry Lyon and James Brayshaw.

Series overview

Episodes

Season 22 (2015)

References 

Lists of Australian non-fiction television series episodes
Television articles with incorrect naming style